Brookfield East High School is a four-year public secondary school located in Brookfield, Wisconsin. The school is part of the Elmbrook School District, and is accredited by the North Central Association. Its rival is Brookfield Central High School, also located in Brookfield.

Music
Brookfield East's music department received the Grammy "Signature Gold" award in the spring of 1999. Brookfield East was one of 16 schools selected of more than 1200 nationwide. The school also received a $5,000 grant, which was used to commission an original work for the school.

Notable alumni
 Leah Vukmir, 1976, state legislator (2002-2019)
 Martin P. Robinson, puppeteer on Sesame Street (1981–present)
 Sara Rodriguez, state legislator
 Pat McCurdy, musician 
 Joe Panos, football player 
 Mike Hoffmann, guitarist and recorder producer

References

External links 
 
School District of Elmbrook website

Educational institutions established in 1962
Public high schools in Wisconsin
Greater Metro Conference
Schools in Waukesha County, Wisconsin
1962 establishments in Wisconsin